Vadim Nikolayevich Salmanov (4 November 1912, in Saint Petersburg – 27 February 1978, in Leningrad) was a Soviet composer. He is perhaps best known for his Symphony No. 2.

Salmanov learned to play the piano as a child from his father. At 18, he was about to attend the Leningrad Conservatory when he decided to study geology instead, eventually working as a geologist until 1935 when he finally decided to attend the Conservatory where he studied composition with Mikhail Gnesin. After graduating, he worked as a composer until the onset of World War II, when he enlisted in the Soviet Army. After the war, he set poems by Blok and Yesenin relating to the war. Later on in his life, Salmanov set poems by Federico García Lorca and Pablo Neruda as well as by Soviet poets.

Salmanov's Symphony No. 1 in D minor was written in 1952 and dedicated to the conductor Evgeny Mravinsky, who would go on to record all of his symphonies. The work uses Slavic folk melodies and a motto theme heard at the beginning of the first movement recurs in the Finale. His Symphony No. 4 was likewise dedicated to Mravinsky.

Although not nearly as political as Tikhon Khrennikov, Salmanov held various political appointments, including Secretary of a Composers' Union. He also taught at the Leningrad Conservatory, his alma mater.

Aside from symphonies, Salmanov's compositions also include six string quartets (1945–71) and two violin concertos (1964, 1974), among other forms.

Selected works

Orchestra 

 Forest, symphonic picture (1948)
 Russian Capriccio (1950)
Symphony no. 1 (1952)
 "Slavic round dance" (1954)
 Poetic Pictures, symphonic suite after Andersen (1955)
 Symphony no. 2 (1959) 
 "Welcome Ode" (1961)
 Children's Symphony (1962)
 Symphony no. 3 (1963) 
 Violin Concerto No. 1 (1964)
 Big City Nights for violin and chamber orchestra (1969)
 "Cheering" (1972)
 Violin Concerto No. 2 (1974)
 Symphony no. 4 (1976)

Chamber instrumental compositions 

 Six string quartets (1945, 1958, 1961, 1963, 1968, 1971)
 Two Sonatas for Violin and Piano (1945, 1962)
 Two trios (1946, 1949)
 Piano Quartet (1947)
 Sonata for cello and piano (1963)
 Monologue for cello and piano (1970, orchestrated 1972)

References
Brief biography and list of works at Onno van Rijen's Soviet Composers site

External links

1912 births
1978 deaths
Soviet composers
Soviet male composers
Musicians from Saint Petersburg
Saint Petersburg Conservatory alumni